The 2014–15 Anaheim Ducks season was the 22nd season for the National Hockey League franchise that was established on June 15, 1993.  The Ducks won 51 regular season games and defeated the Winnipeg Jets and Calgary Flames in the playoffs before falling to the eventual Stanley Cup Champion Chicago Blackhawks in a seven-game Western Conference Final. 2015 marked the third playoffs in a row from which the Ducks were eliminated by losing a Game 7 at home after leading 3–2 after Game 5. Also, their final two losses to the Blackhawks were the only two playoff games the Ducks lost in regulation.

Off-season
On May 19, 2014, the team announced a four-year contract extension for General Manager Bob Murray to keep him under contract through the 2019–20 season.

New uniforms 
On June 27, 2014, the Ducks revealed new home and away jerseys, both based on the previous third jersey design that had been in use since 2010. The previous primary jerseys that had been worn since 2006 were subsequently retired.

Regular season 
The Ducks retired Teemu Selanne's number 8 on January 11, when they hosted the Winnipeg Jets. The Ducks defeated Winnipeg 5–4 in a comeback shootout victory following the ceremony.

Standings

Schedule and results

Pre-season

Regular season

Playoffs

Player statistics 
Final Stats
Skaters

Goaltenders

†Denotes player spent time with another team before joining the Ducks.  Stats reflect time with the Ducks only.
‡Denotes player was traded mid-season.  Stats reflect time with the Team only.
Bold/italics denotes franchise record.

Suspensions/fines

Notable achievements

Awards

Milestones

Transactions
Following the end of the Ducks' 2013–14 season, and during the 2014–15 season, this team has been involved in the following transactions:

Trades

Free agents acquired

Free agents lost

Claimed via waivers

Lost via waivers

Lost via retirement

Player signings
The following players were signed by the Ducks. Two-way contracts are marked with an asterisk (*).

Source: Transaction contract terms from Capgeek.com

Draft picks

Below are the Anaheim Ducks' selections made at the 2014 NHL Entry Draft, held on June 27–28, 2014, at the Wells Fargo Center in Philadelphia, Pennsylvania. The team held the tenth overall pick due to a trade with the Ottawa Senators.

Draft notes

  The Ottawa Senators' first-round pick went to the Anaheim Ducks as the result of trade on July 5, 2013, that sent Bobby Ryan to Ottawa in exchange for Jakob Silfverberg, Stefan Noesen and this pick.
 The Anaheim Ducks' first-round pick went to the Vancouver Canucks as the result of a trade on June 27, 2014, that sent Ryan Kesler and a third-round pick in 2015 to Anaheim in exchange for Nick Bonino, Luca Sbisa, a third-round pick in 2014 (85th overall) and this pick.
  The Toronto Maple Leafs' second-round pick went to the Anaheim Ducks as the result of a trade on November 16, 2013, that sent Peter Holland and Brad Staubitz to Toronto in exchange for Jesse Blacker, Anaheim's seventh-round pick in 2014 and this pick (being conditional at the time of the trade). The condition – Anaheim will receive a second-round pick in 2014 if Holland plays in 25 or more games for the Maple Leafs during the 2013–14 NHL season – was converted on January 18, 2014.
 The Anaheim Ducks' third-round pick went to the New York Rangers as the result of a trade on June 27, 2014, that sent Derek Dorsett to Vancouver in exchange for this pick.    Vancouver previously acquired this pick as the result of a trade on June 27, 2014, that sent Ryan Kesler and a third-round pick in 2015 to Anaheim in exchange for Nick Bonino, Luca Sbisa, a first-round pick in 2014 (24th overall) and this pick.
 The Anaheim Ducks' fourth-round pick went to the Dallas Stars as the result of a trade on March 4, 2014, that sent Stephane Robidas to Anaheim in exchange for this pick (being conditional at the time of the trade). The condition – Dallas will receive a third-round pick in 2014 if Anaheim advances to the 2014 Western Conference Final and Robidas plays in at least 50% of Anaheim's playoff games. If both conditions are not converted then this will remain a fourth-round pick. – was converted on April 21, 2014, when Robidas was injured for the remainder of the 2014 Stanley Cup playoffs.     Anaheim previously re-acquired this pick as the result of a trade on March 4, 2014, that sent Dustin Penner to Washington in exchange for this pick.     Washington previously acquired this pick as the result of a trade on September 29, 2013, that sent Mathieu Perreault to Anaheim in exchange for John Mitchell and this pick.
  The Edmonton Oilers' fifth-round pick went to the Anaheim Ducks as the result of a trade on March 4, 2014, that sent Viktor Fasth to Edmonton in exchange for a third-round pick in 2015 and this pick.
 The Anaheim Ducks' fifth-round pick went to the Pittsburgh Penguins as the result of a trade on February 6, 2013, that sent Ben Lovejoy to Anaheim in exchange for this pick.
 The Anaheim Ducks' sixth-round pick went to the Calgary Flames as the result of a trade on November 21, 2013, that sent Tim Jackman to Anaheim in exchange for this pick.
  The Anaheim Ducks' seventh-round pick was re-acquired as the result of a trade on November 16, 2013, that sent Peter Holland and Brad Staubitz to Toronto in exchange for Jesse Blacker, a conditional second-round pick in 2014 and this pick.     Toronto previously acquired this pick as the result of a trade on March 15, 2013, that sent Dave Steckel to Anaheim in exchange for Ryan Lasch and this pick.

References

Anaheim Ducks seasons
Anaheim
Anaheim
Mighty Ducks of Anaheim
Mighty Ducks of Anaheim